The Lancashire and Yorkshire Railway (LY&R) Class 111  were designed by Kitson and Company for William Barton Wright, who had a requirement for a short-distance passenger tank locomotive.

Design and construction
On his appointment in to the LY&R in 1875 Barton Wright inherited over 800 engines of more than 30 different types and many were insufficiently powerful for their required duties and resolved the L&YR would target achieving a minimum number of standard locomotive types with interchangeable components in order to meet future traffic needs.  He addressed the most urgent needs for freight locomotives and higher end passenger locomotives first before addressing the requirement for a short-distance passenger locomotive in 1877.  The  was essentially a Kitson design with  coupled wheels, and Kitson delivered the first 12 locomotives between April 1877 and July 1878.  The first pair, Nos. 111 & 112 had extended side tanks whose weight restricted the route availability of the engines so subsequent locomotives were delivered with shorter side tanks.

Subsequent batches were ordered from different manufactures and some included some detail variations. Ten came from Dübs & Co. from September 1878.

The rear bogie, of an Adams type but with Timmis springs compressed to  replacing the indiarubber side check springs and the large indiarubber pad being omitted.  It was said to give "steady running" at the rear of the locomotive.

Service
Others were initially allocated for expresses from Manchester to Leeds, Hellifield and Manchester before later being displayed by  tender locomotives to local services. Bulleid, in the biography The Aspinall Era the class is commended on "doing grand work".

Notes

References

Sources and further reading

0-4-4T locomotives
05
Railway locomotives introduced in 1877
Standard gauge steam locomotives of Great Britain
Scrapped locomotives